Arthur Josephus Burks (September 13, 1898 – May 13, 1974) was an American Marine officer and fiction writer.

Burks was born to a farming family in Waterville, Washington.  He married Blanche Fidelia Lane on March 23, 1918, in Sacramento, California, and was the father of four children: Phillip Charles, Wasle Carmen, Arline Mary, and Gladys Lura.  He served with the United States Marine Corps in World War I, and began writing in 1920.  After being stationed in the Dominican Republic and inspired by the native voodoo rituals he'd learned about from Haitian prisoners in a military jail, Burks began to write stories of the supernatural that he sold to the magazine Weird Tales in 1924.

In late 1927 he resigned from the Marine Corps and began writing full-time. He became one of the "million-word-a-year" men in the pulp magazines by virtue of his tremendous output. He wrote approximately 800 stories for pulp magazines. He was known for being able to use any household object that someone would suggest to generate the plot of a story. His byline was commonplace on magazine covers. He wrote primarily in the genres of aviation, detective, adventure, science fiction, sports (primarily boxing), and weird menace. Two genres he was not to be found in were love and westerns. He wrote several series, including the Kid Friel boxing stories for the magazine Gangster Stories, and the Dorus Noel undercover-detective stories for All Detective Magazine, set in Manhattan's Chinatown.

His productivity decreased during the late-1930s. He resumed active military duty as the U.S. joined World War II and eventually retired with the rank of lieutenant colonel.  Burks relocated to Paradise in Lancaster County, Pennsylvania, in 1948, where he continued to write until his death in 1974. Throughout the 1960s, he wrote many works on metaphysics and the paranormal. During his later years, he lectured on paranormal activities and gave psychic readings.

Bibliography

Selected Short stories

"The Invading Horde", Weird Tales (November 1927)
"Monsters of Moyen", Astounding Stories (April 1930)
"The Place of the Pythons", Strange Tales (September 1931)
"Guatemozin the Visitant", Strange Tales (November 1931)
"The Room of Shadows", Weird Tales (May 1936)
"The Discarded Veil" (1937)
"The Golden Horseshoe", (1937)
"Hell Ship", Astounding Stories (August 1938)
"Survival", Marvel Science Stories (August 1938)
"Exodus", Marvel Science (November 1938) [sequel to "Survival"]
"West Point of Tomorrow", Thrilling Wonder Stories (September 1940)
"The Far Detour", Science Fiction Quarterly (Winter 1942)
"Black Harvest of Moraine", Weird Tales (January 1950)

Books

The Splendid Half-Caste (1925) (first novel)
Walter Garvin in Mexico (1927) (with Brigadier-General Smedley D. Butler)
Rivers Into Wilderness (1932) (under penname Burke MacArthur)
Land of Checkerboard Families (1932)
Here Are My People (1934) (family history)
The Great Amen (1938)
Who Do You Think You Are? (1939) (a metaphysical treatise)
Bells Above the Amazon, the Life of Hugo Mense Adventurer of the Spirit (1951)
The Great Mirror (1952)
Look Behind You (Tales of Science, Fantasy, and the Macabre) (1954) (collects 6 stories)
Sex the Divine Flame (1961)
Human Structural Dynamics (1964)
Black Medicine (1966) (Arkham House)
En-Don: The Ageless Wisdom (1973)
The Crimson Blight (2005) Black Dog Books
Grottos of Chinatown: The Dorus Noel Stories (2009) (Off-Trail Publications)
PULP TALES PRESENTS #14: THE CRIMSON BLIGHT and Other Stories (2009) Pulpville Press
The Osilians (2012) Pulpville Press
Earth, The Marauder (2012) Pulpville Press
Man-Ape: Two Tales from the Pulps (2012) Wildside Press
Cathedral of Horror and Other Stories: The Weird Tales of Arthur J. Burks: Volume #1 (2014) (Ramble House)
Masters of the Weird Tale: Arthur J. Burks (2018) (Centipede Press)
The Black Falcon (2021) Age of Aces
Masters of Horror, vol 4: Arthur J. Burks—Wizard of Weird Tales (2022) Armchair Fiction/Sinister Cinema.

Critical Appraisal

E. F. Bleiler described Burks' novel The Great Mirror (1952) as "pretty bad". He stated of the collection Look Behind You (1954) "In terms of content and format this is one of the low points in American fan publishing". Bleiler described Burks' collection Black Medicine (1966) as "a weak collection. The Caribbean stories show racial bias to the point of grotesqueness, and most of the other stories are routine pulp fiction. ["The Desert of the Road"] has points of interest, and ["Bells of Oceana"] is worth reading for a certain baroque, exuberant overkill of horror."

See also 
 Princess Der Ling - Burks wrote a preface to one of her books.

References

Sources

External links
 
 
 
 

1898 births
1974 deaths
20th-century American novelists
Pulp fiction writers
American horror writers
American fantasy writers
American crime fiction writers
American male novelists
United States Marine Corps officers
United States Marine Corps personnel of World War I
United States Marine Corps personnel of World War II
20th-century American male writers
People from Waterville, Washington